Orphée is the French for Orpheus, a legendary figure in Greek mythology, chief among poets and musicians.

Orphée also may refer to:

Music
 La descente d'Orphée aux enfers H 488, a 1680s opera by Marc-Antoine Charpentier
 Orphée (Louis Lully), a 1690 opera
 Orphée aux enfers, Orpheus in the Underworld, a Jacques Offenbach operetta
 Orphée et Eurydice, the French adaptation of Gluck's opera Orfeo ed Euridice
 Orphée, part of Philip Glass's opera adaptations of the Cocteau trilogy
 Orphée (album), a 2016 album by composer Jóhann Jóhannsson

Stage and film
 Orphée, a 1926 French play by Jean Cocteau, known in English as Orpheus (play)
 The Orphic Trilogy, three French films by Jean Cocteau, including
 Orphée, 1950, known in English as Orpheus (film)
 Le testament d'Orphée, 1960, known in English as Testament of Orpheus

Literature
 "Orphee", a Neil Gaiman short story, in A Little Gold Book of Ghastly Stuff.

Anime and manga
 Studio Orphee, Yōsuke Kuroda's anime studio
 Lyra Orphée, a Silver Saint from the manga Saint Seiya
 "Orphée", 2011 song by Mamoru Miyano

Ships
 , a French Navy submarine commissioned in 1933 and discarded in 1946

See also
 Orpheus (disambiguation), the English and German spelling
 Orfeas (disambiguation), Ορφέας, the Greek spelling
 Orfeo (disambiguation), the Italian spelling
 Orfeu (disambiguation), the Portuguese spelling
 Orfey (disambiguation), Орфей, the Russian spelling